Karn Manhas is a Canadian businessman, entrepreneur and a former politician, who served as a BC Liberal Member of the Legislative Assembly of British Columbia from 2001 to 2005, representing the riding of Port Coquitlam-Burke Mountain. Manhas was the youngest MLA ever elected in the history of the province of British Columbia.

Manhas holds a Juris Doctor in Law from the University of British Columbia, and a B.Sc. in Biology (Genetics) and Biotechnology from McGill University.  He formed a tech consulting firm, Karyon Group, which ended in 2008–2009. In 2012, he was named as one of Business In Vancouver's Top Forty Under 40 business people. He is frequently called to speak on issues of sustainability, including at TEDx and Singularity University in Vancouver.

Manhas is the founder of Terramera, a Vancouver-based ag/bio technology company that develops plant-based products, including organic biopesticides and biofertilzers. Terramera's proprietary technology known as Actigate has garnered recognition both in BC and abroad and has lifted the company onto the 2019 Global Cleantech 100 list.

References

External links
Karn Manhas

British Columbia Liberal Party MLAs
McGill University Faculty of Science alumni
Living people
University of British Columbia alumni
Businesspeople from British Columbia
Businesspeople from California
People from Orange County, California
People from Port Coquitlam
Canadian chief executives
21st-century Canadian politicians
Canadian politicians of Indian descent
1976 births